Marcel Franke (born 5 April 1993) is a German professional footballer who plays as a centre-back for Karlsruher SC.

Career
Franke is a product of Dynamo Dresden's youth setup, and was promoted to the first team in 2010. He made his debut in March 2011, when he replaced Sascha Pfeffer in a 3. Liga match against SV Wehen Wiesbaden. In Summer 2013 he was signed for Hallescher FC by former Dynamo Dresden coach Sven Köhler.

In July 2017, he signed for Norwich City on a three-year contract, for an undisclosed fee. He made his debut for them in the opening game of the 2017–18 season, a 1–1 draw with Fulham, playing at centre half along with fellow debutant Christoph Zimmermann. He played in the first seven games of the season (five in the Championship and two in the EFL Cup) but was dropped after a 4–0 defeat at Millwall, with Timm Klose having returned from injury and the club signing Grant Hanley. Although he came on as a late substitute for Klose in a 3–1 win over Brentford in the EFL Cup in September, it was announced in December that he would be returning to Dynamo Dresden on loan in the January transfer window for the remainder of the season.

On 27 June 2018, Franke joined SV Darmstadt 98 on a season-long loan. On 26 June 2019, Norwich City announced that Franke had joined Hannover 96.

Ahead of the 2022–23 season, Franke joined Karlsruher SC on a three-year contract.

Career statistics

References

External links
 
 

1993 births
Living people
German footballers
Association football defenders
Dynamo Dresden players
Dynamo Dresden II players
Hallescher FC players
SpVgg Greuther Fürth players
Norwich City F.C. players
SV Darmstadt 98 players
Hannover 96 players
Karlsruher SC players
2. Bundesliga players
3. Liga players
Regionalliga players
English Football League players
German expatriate footballers
Expatriate footballers in England
German expatriate sportspeople in England
Footballers from Dresden